The 1969 Limerick Senior Hurling Championship was the 75th staging of the Limerick Senior Hurling Championship since its establishment by the Limerick County Board.

Claughaun were the defending champions, however, they were defeated by Patrickswell in the second round.

On 5 October 1969, Patrickswell won the championship after a 0-17 to 2-03 defeat of Pallasgreen in the final. It was their third championship title overall and their first title in three championship seasons.

Results

First round

Second round

Third round

Semi-finals

Final

References

Limerick Senior Hurling Championship
Limerick Senior Hurling Championship